The mayor of Liverpool is the executive mayor of the city of Liverpool in England. The incumbent mayor is Joanne Anderson, who was elected in May 2021.

The mayor of Liverpool was previously branded 'the most powerful politician in England outside the capital', until metro-mayors were elected from 2016, such as the similarly named but separate mayor of the Liverpool City Region.

During 2012, Liverpool City Council decided at a council meeting to adopt the elected mayor executive arrangements, bypassing the typical practice of a local referendum as was planned that year in other cities. On 5 May 2012, former leader of Liverpool City Council Joe Anderson became Liverpool's first elected mayor. In December 2020, Joe Anderson was arrested on suspicion of bribery and witness intimidation, he said he would not seek re-election. A referendum in Liverpool was due to be held in 2023 on the continuation of the mayoralty, but the city council voted to abolish the position from the May 2023 elections following public consultation.

Role and powers of the mayor
The mayor is elected by the residents of Liverpool for a four-year period and is responsible for executive functions of Liverpool City Council and for the day-to-day running of the organisation.  They are charged with leading the city, building investor confidence, and directing new resources to economic priorities. The mayor does not have responsibility for setting the Council budget or formulating policy framework plans as this remains with the city council.  The mayor must appoint a cabinet of two or more councillors (also called the "Executive") who do not have to be from the same political party. The mayor decides on the size of the cabinet and to what extent executive functions may be delegated. The mayor also benefits from so called 'soft powers' conferred on them by being directly elected, which enables them to influence, persuade and co-ordinate on a wider scale.

The mayor of Liverpool is entitled to sit on the proposed "Cabinet of Mayors", along with the other directly elected mayors in England and Wales. Such a position allows a direct route to the prime minister and other senior ministers. Cabinet meetings will be held at least twice a year offering the opportunity to discuss local issues with decision-makers in Whitehall.

In July 2022, Liverpool City Council voted to scrap the directly-elected mayor position, replacing it with a leader and cabinet model. The changes will take effect from May 2023.

Mayor for Liverpool City Region

A number of commentators had expressed disappointment that the mayor's remit does not cover the entire metropolitan area of Liverpool, or the Liverpool City Region.  A 2011 report by former Deputy Prime Minister Michael Heseltine and Terry Leahy argued that a directly elected mayor should cover the six districts of the Liverpool City Region.  The report argued that "in marketing terms Liverpool is a world class brand" and "it would be perverse to do other than embrace the wider area within an identity recognised across the globe."

After opposition from the boroughs of Wirral, St Helens and Sefton, the idea of a city region mayor was dropped.  Minister for Cities, Greg Clark, ruled out the move as "too difficult for now", citing the need for fresh primary legislation and a reorganisation of local government boundaries as practical barriers to the concept.

In November 2015, the Liverpool City Region Combined Authority agreed to a devolution deal with government that resulted in the creation of a 'metro mayor' for the city region. Elections were held in 2017, and Steve Rotheram was elected.

Elections

The mayor is elected by the supplementary vote system for a period of four years.  Each voter lists both a first and second choice candidate. If no-one gets more than 50% of the vote the second choices are allocated to the top two candidates.

2021

Background
In December 2020, Mayor Joe Anderson was arrested on suspicion of bribery and witness intimidation; he said he would not seek re-election. Deputy Mayor Wendy Simon exercised the powers and duties of the office of Mayor of Liverpool from 2020 to 2021 after Anderson temporarily stepped aside in December 2020. Although Anderson formally remained as Mayor until the end of his term, Simon performed Anderson's duties.

A referendum in Liverpool will be held in 2023 on the continuation of the mayoralty.

Labour Party mayoral selection
Eight candidates declared their intention to become the Labour candidate for Mayor of Liverpool. This was short-listed down to three female city councillors: acting mayor Wendy Simon, former deputy mayor Ann O'Byrne and current Lord Mayor Anna Rothery. The result of the internal selection was due to be announced on 5 March. Rothery was endorsed by Dawn Butler MP, Dan Carden MP, Ian Byrne MP, and Jeremy Corbyn, former Leader of the Labour Party and MP for Islington North, as well as Unite the Union.

However, when ballots were supposed to go out in mid-February the party halted the process to re-interview candidates. The Labour Party then decided to re-open the selection process and barred all three original candidates from standing, without any reason being given. Councillor Joanne Anderson was later selected to be Labour's candidate for the city.

Result

2016

2012

List of mayors
Joe Anderson was the inaugural holder of the office of Mayor of Liverpool, first elected in 2012. He indefinitely handed over the powers and duties of the office to his deputy mayor, Wendy Simon, in December 2020 following a bribery scandal. Simon served as acting mayor until the 2021 mayoral election, when Joanne Anderson (no relation to Joe Anderson) was elected.

Salary

The Mayor of Liverpool was paid £77,039.89 in 2012–13. Since 2013, they have been paid £79,500 per annum. An independent panel of experts had recommended that the Mayor's salary should be closer to £80,000 which is intended to reflect the size and population of the city, as well as the role and responsibilities associated with the position both in terms of the executive functions and proposing and implementing of key strategic plans.

References

Liverpool